Statistics of Swiss Super League in the 1947–48 season.

Overview
It was contested by 14 teams, and AC Bellinzona won the championship.

League standings

Results

Sources 
 Switzerland 1947–48 at RSSSF

Swiss Football League seasons
Swiss
Football